The Red Lake Area Combined Roman Catholic Separate School Board manages one school, St. John's Catholic School, in Red Lake, Ontario.  The Board exists because of the remote location of the town, and it is a member of the Northern School Resource Alliance, which is an association of smaller organizations which operate schools in remote towns of northern Ontario.

References
Northern School Resource Alliance

Education in Kenora District
Roman Catholic school districts in Ontario